Erukkanchery or Erukkancheri, is a neighbourhood and a developed residential area in North Chennai, a metropolitan city in Tamil Nadu, India. The Grand Northern Trunk Road passes through the neighbourhood as Erukkanchery High Road in Erukkanchery and Vyasarpadi.

Location
Erukkanchery is located near Kodungaiyur, Moolakadai, Madhavaram, Vyasarpadi and Perambur. It is well connected by bus transport. It is very close to Moolakadai Junction. The nearest railway station of Erukkanchery is Perambur Railway Station which is 3 km away.

References

Neighbourhoods in Chennai